The 1979–80 Cypriot Cup was the 38th edition of the Cypriot Cup. A total of 41 clubs entered the competition. It began on 10 November 1979 with the preliminary round and concluded on 29 June 1980 with the replay final which was held at Makario Stadium. Omonia won their 4th Cypriot Cup trophy after beating Alki Larnaca 3–1 in the final.

Format 
In the 1979–80 Cypriot Cup, participated all the teams of the Cypriot First Division, the Cypriot Second Division and the Cypriot Third Division.

The competition consisted of six knock-out rounds. In all rounds each tie was played as a single leg and was held at the home ground of the one of the two teams, according to the draw results. Each tie winner was qualifying to the next round. If a match was drawn, extra time was following. If extra time was drawn, there was a replay at the ground of the team who were away for the first game. If the rematch was also drawn, then extra time was following and if the match remained drawn after extra time the winner was decided by penalty shoot-out.

The cup winner secured a place in the 1980–81 European Cup Winners' Cup.

Preliminary round 
In the first preliminary draw, participated all the 12 teams of the Cypriot Third Division and 6 of the 14 teams of the Cypriot Second Division (last six of the league table of each group at the day of the draw).

First round 
15 clubs from the Cypriot First Division and the rest clubs from the Cypriot Second Division met the winners of the preliminary round ties:

Second round

Quarter-finals

Semi-finals

Final

Sources

See also 
 Cypriot Cup
 1979–80 Cypriot First Division

Cypriot Cup seasons
1979–80 domestic association football cups
1979–80 in Cypriot football